The 2020 Hangzhou Spark season was the second season of Hangzhou Spark's existence in the Overwatch League and their second season under head coach Lee "Mask" Mu-ho. The Spark planned on hosting two homestand events in the 2020 season, taking place at the Hangzhou Grand Theatre and Wuzhen Grand Theatre; however, due to the COVID-19 pandemic, all homestand events were cancelled by the league.

Preceding offseason

Organizational changes 
In late October, the Spark announced that they had parted ways with assistant coach Han "Sup7eme" Seung-jun. The team signed former Florida Mayhem assistant coach Jung "yeah" Young-su as an assistant coach in mid-November.

Roster changes 
The Spark enter the new season with no free agents, four players which they have the option to retain for another year, and eight players under contract. The OWL's deadline to exercise a team option was November 11, after which any players not retained became a free agent. Free agency officially began on October 7. The Spark's first departure of the offseason was on November 11, when the team released flex support An "Revenge" Hyeong-Geun. On November 23, it was announced that tank player Jeong "NoSmite" Da-Un had signed to the Paris Eternal. The Spark promoted support players Liu "M1ka" Jiming and Tong "Coldest" Xiaodong from their academy team Bilibili Gaming on January 14.

Homestand events 
In August 2019, the Spark announced that they would hold two homestand events, with the first at the Hangzhou Theatre from February 29 to March 1, 2020, and the second at the Wuzhen Grand Theatre from June 21 to 22, 2020. However, due to the COVID-19 pandemic, the league cancelled all February and March matches planned in China, which cancelled the Spark's first homestand at the Hangzhou Theatre. The Overwatch League announced that the cancelled homestand events in China would be rescheduled for Weeks 5 through 7 in a studio in Seoul, South Korea; however, due to the COVID-19 pandemic in South Korea, these matches were cancelled as well.

Roster

Transactions 
Transactions of/for players on the roster during the 2020 regular season:
On February 13, the Spark signed damage player Chon "Ado" Gi-hyeon.

Standings

Game log

Regular season

Midseason tournaments 

| style="text-align:center;" | Bonus wins awarded: 2

Postseason

References 

Hangzhou Spark
Hangzhou Spark
Hangzhou Spark seasons